Lubos Adamec (born 27 April 1994) is a Czech footballer who plays as a defender for Maltese club Pietà Hotspurs.

Career
A youth player at Juventus and Sparta Prague, Adamec made his senior debut while on loan at Přední Kopanina. In 2013, he signed for Śląsk Wrocław in the Polish Ekstraklasa, where he made two appearances and scored one goal. After that, he played for RKSV Leonidas, Stadlau, Xewkija Tigers, Naxxar Lions, Qormi, Oberlausitz Neugersdorf, and Pietà Hotspurs, where he now plays.

References

External links
 Every day I learn something new, Adamec praises life in Juventus 
 He didn't want football talent from Brno to Zbrojovka, now he's kicking in Juventus
 In his youth, he kicked for Juventus or Sparta. He now plays in Malta. I was a young nerd, admits Adamec 
 Talent Adamec: I'll be back when I can do something in football

Living people
1994 births
Czech footballers
Footballers from Brno
Association football defenders
FC Zbrojovka Brno players
Juventus F.C. players
AC Sparta Prague players
Śląsk Wrocław players
S.S. Racing Club Roma players
RKSV Leonidas players
Xewkija Tigers F.C. players
Naxxar Lions F.C. players
Qormi F.C. players
FC Oberlausitz Neugersdorf players
Pietà Hotspurs F.C. players
Czech Fourth Division players
Ekstraklasa players
Serie D players
Derde Divisie players
Austrian Regionalliga players
Maltese Premier League players
Regionalliga players
Czech Republic youth international footballers
Czech expatriate footballers
Expatriate footballers in Italy
Czech expatriate sportspeople in Italy
Expatriate footballers in Poland
Czech expatriate sportspeople in Poland
Expatriate footballers in the Netherlands
Czech expatriate sportspeople in the Netherlands
Expatriate footballers in Austria
Czech expatriate sportspeople in Austria
Expatriate footballers in Malta
Expatriate footballers in Germany
Czech expatriate sportspeople in Germany